DoDo, The Kid from Outer Space is a science fiction animated television series that was syndicated to television from September 24, 1965 to March 7, 1970. The series follows DoDo, a young humanoid extraterrestrial from the planet Hena Hydro, who has come to Earth in his flying saucer, and has numerous adventures. The shorts are often based on scientific and technological advances of the period, most notably the development of computers and space exploration.

Overview
DoDo is a young humanoid extraterrestrial from the planet Hena Hydro, who comes to Earth in his flying saucer, and has numerous adventures.   For the most part, DoDo resembles an Earth child, but has antennas on his large, pointed ears and propellers on his heels that allow him to fly. On Earth, DoDo shares living quarters with Professor Fingers, an eccentric scientist. Other characters include Compy the Computer Bird (DoDo's computer/duck hybrid friend), and How and his younger sister Why, two Earth children.  The characters often speak in rhymed couplets, either independently or playing off each other. A (non-rhyming) narrator accompanies each episode.

Voice cast
 Lucille Bliss as DoDo
 Don Messick as Professor Fingers
 Ed Bishop as Compy the Computer Bird, Narrator and Additional Voices
 June Foray as How and Why

Production
DoDo was created by Lady Stearn Robinson and produced by British animators Halas and Batchelor.  A total of 78 five-minute episodes were produced. The narration was provided by future UFO star Ed Bishop.

Episodes

 Ancient Idol
 The Astrognome
 Bully Adventure
 The Christmas Adventure
 The Day the Earth Was Sold
 Diamond Thieves
 Discovery of Fingegillian
 DoDo and Compy Dance Out of Trouble 
 DoDo and Compy in Hollywood
 DoDo and the Astronaut 
 DoDo and the Easter Bell
 DoDo and the Magic Magnet
 DoDo and the Space Pirates
 DoDo and the Touchies
 DoDo and the Transatlantic Cable
 DoDo at the Ballet
 DoDo at the Fair
 DoDo at the Opera
 DoDo at the Rodeo
 DoDo at the Scout Jamboree 
 DoDo at the Sky Hotel
 DoDo Buys a Space Pig
 DoDo Directs the First Space Ball Game
 DoDo Finds the Cat's Tongue
 DoDo Goes to Aquascot
 DoDo Goes to Paris
 DoDo Goes West
 DoDo Helps Interpol
 DoDo in a Garage Adventure
 DoDo in a Real Good Skate
 DoDo in a Ski Adventure
 DoDo in Japan
 DoDo in Pukcab Land
 DoDo Joins the Circus
 DoDo Meets a Bustling Busker
 DoDo Meets the Abominable Snowman
 DoDo Paints a House 
 DoDo Sees Compy Happen
 DoDo the Circus Star
 DoDo Visits the Moon
 DoDo's Arrival
 The Dodon Discovery 
 Early Bird Catch
 The Elephant Valley
 The Fishing Fleet
 Forty Winks Machine
 Haunted House
 Hi-Jacked Plane
 High Prosecuting
 Horsing Around
 Hurdy Gurdy Man
 Innocent Bulb Napper
 The Kidnapped Kid
 License Trouble
 The Lighthouse 
 Loch Ness Monster
 Magic Magnet Goes Wild 
 The Magic Magnet Saves Some Money
 The Microfilm Spies
 Moon Mice
 Music of the Spheres
 Mystery Fire
 Professor Fingers Builds a Bridge
 The Purloined Picture
 Secret of the Pyramid
 Smellometer
 Smuggle Puzzle
 The Stuck Space Shot
 The Sunken Treasure
 Supersonic Reporting
 The Symphony
 The Tardies
 Tennis Tournament
 The Whale of a Party 
 TV Burglars
 Very Sheepish Affair

In other media 
An episode of DoDo, The Kid from Outer Space was shown as part of the Canadian comedy television series This Movie Sucks! in between its showing of the film The Manster.
The series was broadcast on Spanish television (channel TVE1 & dubbed in the Spanish language) during the mid-1970s.

References

External links

 Toonhound.com entry, with complete episode list
 Toontracker.com entry
 DoDo, The Kid from Outer Space at Don Markstein's Toonopedia. Archived from the original on 4 April 2016.
BCDB

1965 British television series debuts
1970 British television series endings
1960s British children's television series
1970s British children's television series
1960s British animated television series
1970s British animated television series
1960s British science fiction television series
1970s British science fiction television series
Animated television series about children
Animated television series about extraterrestrial life
British children's animated science fiction television series
British children's animated space adventure television series
First-run syndicated television programs in the United States
Television series by Halas and Batchelor